Chloe Brewer (born 12 July 2002) is an English cricketer who currently plays for Surrey, Central Sparks and London Spirit. She plays primarily as a right-handed batter. She has previously played for South East Stars.

Domestic career
Brewer made her county debut in 2019, for Surrey against Yorkshire. Overall, she played five matches for Surrey in 2019, but had little opportunity to contribute. She played eight matches for the side in the 2021 Women's Twenty20 Cup, but scored just 26 runs. However, she was the leading run-scorer in the 2021 Women's London Championship, with 139 runs including two half-centuries. She played one match in the 2022 Women's Twenty20 Cup, scoring 32 runs and taking one wicket.

In 2020, Brewer played for South East Stars in the Rachael Heyhoe Flint Trophy. She appeared in the final two matches of the Stars' season, and made an immediate impression, scoring 40 on debut against Sunrisers and then making her List A high score of 79 against Southern Vipers. She played two matches in the 2021 Rachael Heyhoe Flint Trophy, scoring 42 runs. She also played one match in South East Stars' victorious 2021 Charlotte Edwards Cup campaign, scoring 41 from 33 balls against Central Sparks. In 2022, she played five matches for South East Stars in the 2022 Rachael Heyhoe Flint Trophy, scoring 172 runs at an average of 34.40. She scored two half-centuries, against Western Storm and Central Sparks. She also signed for London Spirit in The Hundred as an injury replacement for Heather Knight, but did not play a match. In November 2022, it was announced that Brewer had signed for Central Sparks for the following season, and had signed her first professional contract.

References

External links

2002 births
Living people
Place of birth missing (living people)
Surrey women cricketers
South East Stars cricketers